The Woodlynne School District is a community public school district that serves students in pre-kindergarten through eighth grade from Woodlynne, in Camden County, New Jersey, United States.

As of the 2019–20 school year, the district, comprised of one school, had an enrollment of 403 students and 33.1 classroom teachers (on an FTE basis), for a student–teacher ratio of 12.2:1.

The district is classified by the New Jersey Department of Education as being in District Factor Group "B", the second-lowest of eight groupings. District Factor Groups organize districts statewide to allow comparison by common socioeconomic characteristics of the local districts. From lowest socioeconomic status to highest, the categories are A, B, CD, DE, FG, GH, I and J.

Students in public school for ninth through twelfth grades attend Collingswood High School in neighboring Collingswood as part of a sending/receiving relationship with the Collingswood Public Schools, together with students from Oaklyn, New Jersey. As of the 2019–20 school year, the high school had an enrollment of 718 students and 64.5 classroom teachers (on an FTE basis), for a student–teacher ratio of 11.1:1.

School
Woodlynne Elementary School served 396 students in grades PreK-8 in the 2019–20 school year. The school had an enrollment of 382 students in the 2014-15 school year.

Administration
Core members of the district's administration are:
Jackie Walters, Superintendent / Principal
Greg Gontowski, Business Administrator

Board of education
The district's board of education, comprised of seven members, sets policy and oversees the fiscal and educational operation of the district through its administration. As a Type II school district, the board's trustees are elected directly by voters to serve three-year terms of office on a staggered basis, with either two or three seats up for election each year held (since 2012) as part of the November general election. The board appoints a superintendent to oversee the day-to-day operation of the district.

References

External links
Woodlynne School District
 
School Data for the Woodlynne School District, National Center for Education Statistics

New Jersey District Factor Group B
School districts in Camden County, New Jersey
Woodlynne, New Jersey